The 2014–15 season was the 91st season in the existence of AEK Athens F.C. and the first in the second tier of Greek football. They competed in the Football League and the Greek Cup. The season began on 29 August 2014 and finished on 10 June 2015.

Events
30 July 2014: The Greek parliament passed the bill for AEK Stadium.
7 September 2014: AEK Athens' player Petros Mantalos debuted in Greece national team, against Romania.
18 November 2014: Michalis Bakakis becomes AEK Athens' 101st player to play for the Greece national team, in a friendly match against Serbia.
27 March 2015 AEK were deducted 3 points for interruption of the match, 2 games behind closed doors and fine of 17,000€ after violations at the Cup match against Olympiacos on 11 March 2015 at Olympic Stadium. The game was awarded 0-3 to Olympiacos.
4 April 2015 AEK Athens finished the Football League regular season with 12 Home wins, 10 Away wins and 2 Away draws. AEK Athens will enter the Promotion play-offs with 10 points bonus.
11 July 2015 AEK Athens finally returns to Super League.

Players

Squad information

NOTE: The players are the ones that have been announced by the AEK Athens' press release. No edits should be made unless a player arrival or exit is announced. Updated 30 June 2015, 23:59 UTC+3.

Transfers

In

Summer

Winter

Out

Summer

Loan out

Summer

Winter

Renewals

Overall transfer activity

Spending
Summer:  €650,000

Winter:  €0

Total:  €650,000

Income
Summer:  €0

Winter:  €0

Total:  €0

Expenditure
Summer:  €650,000

Winter:  €0

Total:  €650,000

Pre–season and friendlies

Football League

South Group League Table

Results summary

Results by Matchday

Fixtures

Promotion play-offs

Results by Matchday

Fixtures

Greek Cup

Preliminary round

Group E

Matches

Round of 16

Quarter-finals

Statistics

Squad statistics

! colspan="11" style="background:#FFDE00; text-align:center" | Goalkeepers
|-

! colspan="11" style="background:#FFDE00; color:black; text-align:center;"| Defenders
|-

! colspan="11" style="background:#FFDE00; color:black; text-align:center;"| Midfielders
|-

! colspan="11" style="background:#FFDE00; color:black; text-align:center;"| Forwards
|-

! colspan="11" style="background:#FFDE00; color:black; text-align:center;"| Left during Winter Transfer Window
|-

|}

Disciplinary record

|-
! colspan="17" style="background:#FFDE00; text-align:center" | Goalkeepers

|-
! colspan="17" style="background:#FFDE00; color:black; text-align:center;"| Defenders

|-
! colspan="17" style="background:#FFDE00; color:black; text-align:center;"| Midfielders

|-
! colspan="17" style="background:#FFDE00; color:black; text-align:center;"| Forwards

|-
! colspan="17" style="background:#FFDE00; color:black; text-align:center;"| Left during Winter Transfer window

|}

Starting 11

Goalscorers

References

External links
AEK Athens F.C. Official Website

2014-15
Greek football clubs 2014–15 season